Gervasius (died after 1157 or 1158) was a Hungarian prelate who served as Bishop of Győr from 1156 to 1157 or 1158.

Career
Gervasius or Geruasius started his ecclesiastical career as a member of the royal chapel during the reign of Géza II of Hungary. He was styled as royal chaplain in 1146 and 1150. He was described as "high-skilled, remarkably cultivated man" by chronicler Rahewin. He was elected Bishop of Győr in 1156.

Becoming a member of the royal council, he interceded with Géza II in March 1157 to grant the collection right of salt duties to the Archdiocese of Esztergom at Nána and Kakat (present-day Štúrovo, Slovakia). Through his intercession, Géza II also granted some privileges to the cathedral chapter of Győr. Still in the same year, Gervasius contributed and permitted the foundation of the Benedictine Abbey of Küszén (later Németújvár, present-day Burg Güssing in Austria) to comes Wolfer, a Carinthian-born knight and ancestor of the Kőszegi family. Gervasius subordinated the monastery to the Pannonhalma Abbey.

According to the contemporaneous Rahewin, Géza's younger brother Stephen was "accused before the king of aspiring to royal power". In fear of being seized and executed by his brother, Stephen sought refuge in the Holy Roman Empire in summer 1157. Upon the emperor's demand, who favored Stephen, Géza accepted Frederick Barbarossa as arbitrator in his conflict with Stephen and sent his envoys – Judge royal Héder (Wolfer's brother) and Bishop Gervasius – to the Imperial Diet at Regensburg in January 1158. There the envoys refused Stephen's accusations and have successfully achieved that Frederick took a neutral position, who "decided to defer to a more suitable time the settlement" of the quarrel between Géza and Stephen. After Héder and Gervasius' successful diplomatic mission, Stephen, left the German court for the Byzantine Empire and settled in Constantinople. Rahewin, who narrated the events in the continuation of Otto of Freising's Gesta Friderici imperatoris, incorrectly referred to Gervasius as "Bishop of Vasvár", which was, in fact, the collegiate chapter of his diocese. The remaining part of Gervasius' episcopate is unknown. His nearest known successor was Andrew, who was elected Bishop of Győr in 1169, a decade later.

References

Sources

 
 
 
 

12th-century Hungarian people
Bishops of Győr
Year of birth unknown
Year of death unknown
12th-century Roman Catholic bishops in Hungary
Medieval Hungarian diplomats